Kharaishvili is a Georgian surname. Notable people with the surname include:
Giorgi Kharaishvili (born 1996), Georgian footballer 
Giorgi Kharaishvili (rugby union) (born 1999), Georgian rugby union player

Surnames of Georgian origin
Georgian-language surnames
Surnames of Abkhazian origin